Khasavyurt (Xasi-Evl; , Xasav-yurt) is a city in the Republic of Dagestan, Russia. Population:

History
It was founded in 1846 and granted town status in 1931. During the Russian Empire, the settlement was the administrative capital of the Khasavyurtovsky Okrug of the Terek Oblast. On August 19, 2012, six police officers were killed and eight people injured at two gun and bomb attacks in the city. The town has thousands of Salafis. In December 2016, the Russian authorities reported the existence of the Khasavyurt Group, allegedly linked to the Islamic State and a flareup of incidents and skirmishes between the police and local militants in and around the city.

Administrative and municipal status
Within the framework of administrative divisions, Khasavyurt serves as the administrative center of Khasavyurtovsky District, even though it is not a part of it. As an administrative division, it is incorporated separately as the City of Khasavyurt—an administrative unit with the status equal to that of the districts. As a municipal division, the City of Khasavyurt is incorporated as Khasavyurt Urban Okrug.

Demographics
Ethnic groups (2010 census):
Avars (30.7%)
Chechens (28.5%)
Kumyks (28.1%)
Dargins (4.1%)
Laks (3.3%)
Russians (2.3%)
Lezgins (1.6%)

Climate
Khasavyurt has a humid continental climate with hot summers and cold winters. (Köppen climate classification: Dfa).

Economy
The main local industries are food processing, brick making and garment making.

Notable people
Arsen Akayev, former professional football player, coach
Adam Batirov, Russian-Bahraini Olympic freestyle wrestler
Mavlet Batirov, Olympic freestyle wrestler
Artur Beterbiyev, boxer
Viktoriya Isakova, actress
Zabit Magomedsharipov, MMA fighter
Ramazan Sahin, Olympic freestyle wrestler
Adam Saitiev, Olympic freestyle wrestler
Buvaisar Saitiev, Olympic freestyle wrestler
Zaur Uguev, Olympic freestyle wrestler
Murad Umakhanov, Olympic freestyle wrestler
Elmadi Zhabrailov (born 1965), freestyle wrestler
Musa Murtazaliev, freestyle wrestler representing Armenia
Dzhamal Otarsultanov, Olympic freestyle wrestler

Sister city
 Nablus, Palestine

See also
Khasavyurt Accord, a 1996 peace agreement ending the First Chechen War

References

Notes

Sources

External links

Official website of Khasavyurt 
Khasavyurt Business Directory 

Cities and towns in Dagestan
Terek Oblast